The Ballet Municipal de Lima is Peru's classical ballet company, based in the capital city of Lima.

History
The Ballet Municipal de Lima was founded in 1983 by Lucy Telge de Linder, who remains the current Director of the company. Although the company is a small one by international standards (48 dancers during the 2011-2012 season), it is a professional company that performs regularly in Lima, as well as touring throughout Latin America.

The company's repertoire includes classical ballet standards such as Giselle, Swan Lake, La Sylphide, Coppélia, Romeo and Juliet, La Fille Mal Gardee, Le Corsaire, and several others.

References

See also

Peruvian culture
Ballet

Ballet companies in Peru